The Somali short-toed lark (Alaudala somalica) is a small passerine bird of the lark family found in eastern and north-eastern Africa.

The habitat of the Somali short-toed lark is subtropical or tropical dry lowland grassland.

Taxonomy and systematics
The Somali short-toed lark was originally placed in the genus Calandrella until moved to Alaudala in 2014. Formerly or presently, some authorities considered the Somali short-toed lark as a subspecies of the Mediterranean short-toed lark and/or the Athi short-toed lark as a subspecies of the Somali short-toed lark. The alternate name rufous short-toed lark is also used to describe the red-capped lark.

Subspecies 
Three subspecies are recognized: 
 A. s. perconfusa - (White, CMN, 1960): Found in north-western Somalia
 A. s. somalica - Sharpe, 1895: Found in eastern Ethiopia and northern Somalia
 A. s. megaensis - (Benson, 1946): Found from southern Ethiopia to central Kenya

References

Somali short-toed lark
Birds of the Horn of Africa
Somali short-toed lark
Taxonomy articles created by Polbot